E. L. Quirk (born 6 January 1898; died 1 August 1967;) was a Missionary who served in India from 1925 through 1953.

Quirk came to India in 1925 as a Missionary of the Canadian Baptist Mission and served on the teaching staff of the CBM-McLaurin High School, Kakinada. Quirk continued to serve in India in spite of World War II and was based at Kakinada looking after the educational endeavours of the Canadian Baptist Ministries.

Quirk's contribution to pastoral ministry was manifold as he helped establish Churches in Visakhapatnam and Kothavalasa in the areas of,
 Allipuram,
 Chengalraopet,
 Gopalapatnam,
 Kancharapalem,
 Maddilapalem,
 Malkapuram,
 Scindia colony,
 Kothavalasa

References

20th-century Canadian Baptist ministers
Baptist writers
1898 births
1966 deaths
McMaster University alumni
Telugu people
Christian clergy from Andhra Pradesh
Indian Baptists
Canadian Baptist Ministries missionaries in India
Convention of Baptist Churches of Northern Circars pastors
Canadian Baptist Ministries